Jatu Lahiri (28 April 1936 – 16 February 2023) was an Indian politician. He was an elected member of the Legislative Assembly and MLA at Shibpur (Vidhan Sabha constituency) of the state of West Bengal in India.

Lahiri was also the chief advisor of the "Santragachi Co-operative Bank".

Lahiri died on 16 February 2023, at the age of 86.

References

1936 births
2023 deaths
Trinamool Congress politicians from West Bengal
West Bengal MLAs 1991–1996
West Bengal MLAs 1996–2001
West Bengal MLAs 2001–2006
West Bengal MLAs 2011–2016
West Bengal MLAs 2016–2021
Bharatiya Janata Party politicians from West Bengal
People from Howrah district